Island Trees High School is a coeducational public high school serving students in ninth grade through twelfth grade, in Levittown, New York, United States, 31.0 miles east of Manhattan. It is a part of the Island Trees Union Free School District. The school offers various clubs, electives, and AP courses. Island Trees High School serves portions of Levittown, Bethpage and Seaford.

As of the 2016-17 school year, the school had an enrollment of 746 students and 59 classroom teachers (on a full-time equivalent basis), for a student–teacher ratio of 12.74:1. There were 145 students (19.4% of enrollment) eligible for free lunch under the National School Lunch Act and 38 (5% of students) eligible for reduced-cost lunch. The dropout rate was 1%.

Notable alumni
 Kevin Covais, American Idol finalist
 Jesse Kinch, rock singer, songwriter and guitar player
 Eddie Money, rock guitarist, saxophonist and singer-songwriter with 11 top 40 songs
 Donnie Klang, singer-songwriter
 Tom Kapinos, Screen and television writer
 Jason Concepcion, Writer and Podcast Host

References

External links
 

Public high schools in New York (state)
Schools in Nassau County, New York